Wasatch National Forest was established as the Wasatch Forest Reserve by the U.S. Forest Service in Utah on August 16, 1906  with  to the east of Salt Lake City and Provo. It became a National Forest on March 4, 1907. On July 1, 1908 Grantsville National Forest and Salt Lake National Forest were added. In 1973  Wasatch was combined administratively with Cache National Forest, creating Wasatch-Cache National Forest. In descending order of acreage, the Wasatch National Forest portion is located in Summit, Tooele, Salt Lake, Davis, Uinta (Wyoming), Duchesne, Wasatch, Morgan, Utah, Weber, and Juab counties in Utah except Uinta, which is in southwestern Wyoming. There are local ranger district offices in Kamas and Salt Lake City in Utah, and in Evanston and Mountain View in Wyoming. Administrative headquarters reside with the combined Uinta-Wasatch-Cache National Forest in South Jordan, Utah.

Wilderness areas
There are five officially designated wilderness areas within Wasatch National Forest that are part of the National Wilderness Preservation System. Two of these extend into neighboring National Forests, as indicated.
 Deseret Peak Wilderness
 High Uintas Wilderness (mostly in Ashley NF)
 Lone Peak Wilderness (mostly in Uinta NF)
 Mount Olympus Wilderness
 Twin Peaks Wilderness

References

External links
Forest History Society
Forest History Society:Listing of the National Forests of the United States Text from Davis, Richard C., ed. Encyclopedia of American Forest and Conservation History. New York: Macmillan Publishing Company for the Forest History Society, 1983. Vol. II, pp. 743-788.

Former National Forests of Utah